CEED or Ceed may refer to:

 Central and Eastern Europe Development Institute, a development institute
 Common Entrance Examination for Design, a joint entrance exam for post-graduate studies in India
 Kia Ceed, a 2006–present South Korean compact car for the European market